The R567 road is a regional road in Ireland. It is a road on the Iveragh Peninsula in County Kerry. The road is part of the Wild Atlantic Way. Parts of the road form part of the Emlagh Loop walking trail.

The R567 travels west from the N70 to terminate at the R566 at Emlaghmore Bridge.

References

Regional roads in the Republic of Ireland
Roads in County Kerry